Murray Hocking (born 31 May 1971 in Victoria) is a badminton player from Australia. As well as representing Australia in 3 commonwealth games (2002, 1998 and 1994) he represented his country in badminton at the 1996 Olympic Games in Atlanta, making it to the round of 32.

References 

Australian male badminton players
Badminton players at the 1996 Summer Olympics
Olympic badminton players of Australia
1971 births
Living people
Commonwealth Games competitors for Australia
Badminton players at the 2002 Commonwealth Games
Badminton players at the 1998 Commonwealth Games
Badminton players at the 1994 Commonwealth Games
Medallists at the 1994 Commonwealth Games
Commonwealth Games medallists in badminton
Commonwealth Games bronze medallists for Australia